William Somers (born c. 1850) was a Scottish international footballer who played as a right back. Born in the mid/late 1850s, he started his career with Glasgow Eastern before moving to Third Lanark in 1877. The side reached the 1878 Scottish Cup Final, but were beaten 1–0 by Vale of Leven. In 1879, Somers transferred to Queen's Park where he won the Scottish Cup in 1880. He made three appearances for the Scotland national football team, two while playing for Third Lanark in 1879 and the third while with Queen's Park in 1880.

References

Sources

External links

Scottish footballers
Scotland international footballers
Association football defenders
Third Lanark A.C. players
Queen's Park F.C. players
Year of death missing
Year of birth uncertain
Footballers from Glasgow
1850s births
Eastern F.C. players